The Asclepieion of Pergamon was the sanctuary built in honour of the gods Asclepius and Hygieia, located west of the Pergamon hill.

Notes

Buildings and structures completed in the 4th century BC